The Battle of Lone Tree Hill, is the name given to a major battle in 1944 in Dutch New Guinea, between United States and Japanese forces. Fought over the period 17 May – 2 September 1944, the battle formed part of the Western New Guinea campaign.

The battle, with the associated attacks on Sawar Airfield  to the north and Wakde, an island just off shore of Toem  to the south, took place after the opening phase of the campaign, which saw landings at Hollandia and the Aitape in late April.

Nevertheless, elements of the Japanese 223rd and 224th Infantry Regiments, commanded by Lieutenant General Hachiro Tagami, were concentrated at Lone Tree Hill, overlooking Maffin Bay, and were blocking any further advance toward Sarmi, by the 158th Regimental Combat Team of the U.S. Army. The Japanese were in well-prepared positions, which included fortified caves. Meanwhile, the main body of the Japanese 223rd Infantry Regiment had outflanked the U.S. units, and a battalion of the Japanese 224th Infantry Regiment, was retreating from Hollandia, towards the Toem-Wakde-Sarmi area.

The hill was named for a single tree depicted on its crest by U.S. maps; it was a coral formation, covered with dense tropical rain forest and undergrowth. The north side was characterized by a steep slope. The eastern slope was fronted by a short, twisting stream which the Americans named Snaky River.

On 14 June, U.S. General Walter Krueger sent the U.S. 6th Infantry Division to relieve the 158th RCT. After ten days of hard fighting, the US forces took Lone Tree Hill. The Japanese suffered more than 1,000 dead, including some trapped in collapsed caves. The U.S. Army suffered about 700 battle and 500 non-battle casualties. By 1 September, there were still around 2,000 Japanese troops in the area, but they no longer posed a threat to Allied operations. With Lone Tree Hill in American possession, Maffin Bay became a major staging base for six subsequent battles: Biak, Noemfoor, Sansapor, Leyte and Luzon.

Notes

References
 

South West Pacific theatre of World War II
Conflicts in 1944
1944 in the Dutch East Indies
May 1944 events
June 1944 events
July 1944 events
August 1944 events
September 1944 events